Dispholidus is a genus of reptiles belonging to the family Colubridae.
The species of this genus are found in sub-Saharan Africa.

Species

Dispholidus typus  – Boomslang
Dispholidus pembae 
Dispholidus punctatus

References

Dispholidus
Snake genera
Taxa named by Georges Louis Duvernoy